Alla Ramakrishna Reddy, popularly known by his initials RK, is an Indian politician from Andhra Pradesh. He is a Member of the Legislative Assembly (MLA) representing the Mangalagiri Assembly constituency from the YSR Congress Party since 2014.

Political career 
Ramakrishna Reddy is a politician from YSR Congress Party. He has contested in 2014 and 2019 elections for Andhra Pradesh Legislative Assembly from Mangalagiri constituency and has won both the elections. In 2014 elections, he won the election against the incumbent Kamala Kanduru with a meagre majority of 12 votes. In 2019 elections, he won against Nara Lokesh of Telugu Desam Party with a majority of 5,337 votes.

He has also served as the Chairman of the Andhra Pradesh Capital Region Development Authority (AP CRDA) from June 2019 until its reorganisation to form Amaravati Metropolitan Region Development Authority (AMRDA) on 1 August 2020.

References 

Telugu politicians
Living people
YSR Congress Party politicians
People from Guntur district
Andhra Pradesh MLAs 2019–2024
Andhra Pradesh MLAs 2014–2019
Year of birth missing (living people)